Byron Keith Darby  (born June 4, 1960) is a former American football defensive end in the National Football League. He was drafted by the Philadelphia Eagles in the fifth round of the 1983 NFL Draft. He played college football at USC.

Darby also played for the Indianapolis Colts and Detroit Lions.

1960 births
Living people
Players of American football from Los Angeles
American football defensive ends
American football defensive tackles
USC Trojans football players
Philadelphia Eagles players
Indianapolis Colts players
Detroit Lions players